Wilhelm Bendow (29 September 1884 – 29 May 1950) was a German film actor who appeared in many films during his career. Bendow made his debut in the 1913 film Aus eines Mannes Mädchenzeit.

Selected filmography
 Lust for Life (1922)
 La Boheme (1923)
 The Little Napoleon (1923)
 Die Fledermaus (1923)
 Wood Love (1925)
 The Woman with That Certain Something (1925)
 Chaste Susanne (1926)
 The Brothers Schellenberg (1926)
 We Belong to the Imperial-Royal Infantry Regiment (1926)
 Roses from the South (1926)
 The Divorcée (1926)
 His Toughest Case (1926)
 My Aunt, Your Aunt (1927)
 The False Prince (1927)
 A Crazy Night (1927)
 Carnival Magic (1927)
 Her Dark Secret (1929)
 German Wine (1929)
 The Tender Relatives (1930)
 Alraune (1930)
 The Blonde Nightingale (1930)
 The Emperor's Sweetheart (1931)
 Madame Pompadour (1931)
 Storms of Passion (1932)
 A Mad Idea (1932)
 The Two Seals (1934)
 His Late Excellency (1935)
 Knockout (1935)
 The Schimeck Family (1935)
 The Beggar Student (1936)
 Land of Love (1937)
 The Divine Jetta (1937)
 The Irresistible Man (1937)
 The Roundabouts of Handsome Karl (1938)
 My Aunt, Your Aunt (1939)
 Doctor Crippen (1942)
 The Thing About Styx (1942)
 We Make Music (1942)
 Münchhausen (1943)
 I Entrust My Wife to You (1943)
 The Golden Spider (1943)
 Tell the Truth (1946)
 No Place for Love (1947)
 King of Hearts (1947)

References

Bibliography
 Elsässer, Thomas. A Second Life: German Cinema's First Decades. Amsterdam University Press, 1996.

External links

1884 births
1950 deaths
German male silent film actors
German male film actors
People from Einbeck
20th-century German male actors